Adam Schoenberg (born November 15, 1980) is an American composer. A member of the Atlanta School of Composers, his works have been performed by numerous orchestras and ensembles in the U.S. Schoenberg was the 2010-2012 guest composer for the Aspen Music Festival, the 2012-2013 composer-in-residence for the Kansas City Symphony, the 2013-2014 composer-in-residence for the Lexington Philharmonic, and the 2015-2017 composer-in-residence for the Fort Worth Symphony. Schoenberg's honors include a 2009 and 2010 MacDowell Colony fellowship, the 2007 Morton Gould Young Composer Award from ASCAP, and the 2006 Charles Ives Prize from the American Academy of Arts & Letters.

A graduate of Oberlin Conservatory of Music, Schoenberg earned his Masters and Doctor of Musical Arts from The Juilliard School, where he studied composition with John Corigliano and Robert Beaser and wrote his thesis about noted film composer Thomas Newman. While at Juilliard, Schoenberg was awarded the Palmer-Dixon Prize (for "Most Outstanding Composition"). A resident of Los Angeles
, 
Schoenberg is Assistant Professor of Composition at Occidental College. He is married to playwright and screenwriter Janine Salinas Schoenberg.

List of compositions

Orchestral
Finding Rothko (2006) for chamber orchestra
Up! (2010) for orchestra
American Symphony (2011) for orchestra
La Luna Azul (2012) for orchestra
Picture Studies (2012) for orchestra
Bounce (2013) for orchestra
Canto (2014) for orchestra
Scatter (2015) concerto for PROJECT Trio and orchestra
Go (2016) for chamber orchestra
Stars (2016) for orchestra

Band
"Symphony No. 2 - Migration" (2017) for wind ensemble
"Finding Rothko" (2006/2017) for wind ensemble, transcribed by Lance Sample
Rise (2018) for concert band

References

External links

1980 births
Living people
People from Northampton, Massachusetts
American male classical composers
American classical composers
American film score composers
American male film score composers
Aspen Music Festival and School faculty
Juilliard School alumni
Oberlin Conservatory of Music alumni
Occidental College faculty
University of California, Los Angeles faculty
Classical musicians from Massachusetts